Coshmore and Coshbride is a barony in County Waterford, Ireland.

Etymology
Coshmore is derived from Irish Cois Abha Móire, "bank of the Great River", referring to the Munster Blackwater. Coshbride means "banks of the Bride", referring to the River Bride.

Geography
Coshmore and Coshbride is located in western County Waterford, to the south of the Knockmealdown Mountains and the River Araglin.

History

The region is the site of the ancient Lismore Cathedral, and was historically the property of the Fitzgerald Earls of Desmond. The Aherns, Barrys, Keanes, Tobins and Walshes were also landowning families.

Coshmore and Coshbride were separate baronies in 1821, but had been united by 1831.

The barony gave its name to the Coshmore and Coshbride Hunt.

List of settlements

Below is a list of settlements in Coshmore and Coshbride barony:

Ballyduff
Cappoquin
Knockanore
Lismore
Tallow

References

Baronies of County Waterford